Calcethorpe is a hamlet and deserted medieval village (DMV), in the East Lindsey district of Lincolnshire, England. The hamlet forms part of the civil parish of Calcethorpe with Kelstern.

Calcethorpe is recorded in the 1086 Domesday Book as having two households and six acres of meadow.

The church was dedicated to Saint Faith but had fallen into ruin and disappeared by about 1450, around the same time as the rest of the village was abandoned. The earthworks near Manor Farm are known locally as 'Priests Close' and the probable site of the church.

References

External links

Deserted medieval villages in Lincolnshire
East Lindsey District